Clifton–Aldan station is a SEPTA station in Clifton Heights, Pennsylvania. It serves the Media/Wawa Line and is nearby the Clifton–Aldan station of the SEPTA Route 102 trolley. It is located at Springfield Road and West Maryland Avenue and has a 110-space parking lot. In 2013, this station saw 351 boardings and 329 alightings on an average weekday.

Station layout
Clifton–Aldan has two low-level side platforms.

History
According to the Pennsylvania Railroad Stations Past & Present website, Clifton-Aldan station was originally built in 1880 by the Pennsylvania Railroad as Aldan station, in the style of a stone Victorian farm house 21/2 stories high. Parking is available on the south side of the tracks on the corner of Springfield Road and West Maryland Avenue as well as on the north side of the tracks along Jefferson Street between South Springfield Road and South Penn Street.

On May 28, 2009, SEPTA approved a $2.6 million rehabilitation effort which will include Clifton–Aldan station.

Trolley

The Clifton–Aldan trolley stop is officially a separate station requiring additional fare. The trolley stop is on the portion of the line where the tracks run in the streets rather than on their own right-of-way. Trolleys run beneath a narrow and low  bridge over Springfield Road with a parallel pedestrian tunnel before approaching the regional railroad station. South of the station, the Route 102 line moves from Springfield Road to Woodlawn Avenue. A shelter for the northbound trolley exists on Woodlawn Avenue near the corner of Springfield Road.

References

External links
 (Route 102)
 SEPTA – Clifton–Aldan station (Media/Wawa)
SEPTA Media/Wawa & Route 102 Clifton-Aldan Station (SubwayNut.com)
 Springfield Road entrance to regional rail from Google Maps Street View
 Station House (regional rail) from Google Maps Street View
 Light Rail Station from Google Maps Street View

SEPTA Regional Rail stations
SEPTA Media–Sharon Hill Line stations
Railway stations in the United States opened in 1880
1880 establishments in Pennsylvania
Stations on the West Chester Line
Former Pennsylvania Railroad stations